The Happiness Begins Tour was the tenth concert tour by the Jonas Brothers, in promotion of their fifth studio album, Happiness Begins (2019). The tour began on August 7, 2019, in Miami, Florida at the American Airlines Arena and concluded on February 22, 2020, in Paris, France at the AccorHotels Arena.

Background
On April 30, 2019, the band and venues teased the phrase "Happiness Begins tomorrow", hinting a tour. On May 1, 2019, the band officially announced their first major arena concert tour in ten years. Currently including 70 concerts in North America, 5 in Latin America, and 16 concerts in Europe. Bebe Rexha, Jordan McGraw, and Livvia are the opening acts in North America. On May 7, additional shows where added in Los Angeles, New York City, Toronto, and Chicago due to the high ticket demand. Due to overwhelming demand, on May 10, 23 additional were announced. On May 30, additional shows were added in Mexico City and Monterrey, due to high ticket demand.

On June 6, 2019, the band added an extra London date at Wembley Arena. On June 10, 2019, more shows were added in North American cities of Albany, University Park, Cincinnati and Birmingham, as well a second show in Inglewood due to overwhelming demand.

Critical reception 
The tour has received positive reviews. Patricia Cardenas, from the Miami New Times, called the Miami show "genuinely touching and personal" and "dynamic and poignant". Cardenas also stated how this tour was a way of "giving back to their adoring fans while saluting the band they built into an empire as teenagers on the Disney Channel." Brad Haynes, from radio station Mix 105.1, wrote for Orlando, "The Jonas Brothers have risen once again". Mady Dudley, from Creative Loafing, called the show in Tampa, "unfiltered". Dudley also stated, "A lot has changed, and the brothers are all grown up, but the innocence of their music and their legacy still lives on". John Moser, from the Morning Call, wrote for Philadelphia, complimenting each brother individually. Moser commented Nick's "mature" and "gusto" voice, and Joe's "powerful, distinctive delivery".

Set list
This set list is from the concert on August 7, 2019, in Miami. It is not intended to represent all shows from the tour.

 "Rollercoaster"
 "S.O.S"
 "Cool"
 "Only Human"
 "Strangers"
 "That's Just the Way We Roll"
 "Fly With Me"
 "Used To Be"
 "Hesitate"
 "Can't Have You" 
 "Jealous"
 "Cake by the Ocean"
 "Comeback"
 "When You Look Me in the Eyes"
 "I Believe"
 "Mandy" / "Paranoid" / "Got Me Going Crazy" / "Play My Music" / "World War III" / "Hold On" / "Tonight"
 "Lovebug"
 "Year 3000"
Encore
 "Burnin' Up"
 "Sucker"

Notes

 During the show in Miami, the Jonas Brothers were joined by Sebastián Yatra, Daddy Yankee and Natti Natasha in a surprise performance of "Runaway".
During the show in Albany, the show started with "Burnin' Up" before performing "Rollercoaster" due to venue restrictions prohibiting the usual entrance.
 During the first show in Toronto, "Burnin Up" and "Sucker" were not performed due to unforeseen technical difficulties.
 During the show in Hershey, the Jonas Brothers were joined by John Taylor & Greg Garbowsky in a surprise performance of "Lovebug" and by Big Rob in a surprise performance of "Burnin' Up".
 During the show in Nashville, the Jonas Brothers were joined by Dan + Shay in a surprise performance of their song "Tequila".
 During the show in Anaheim only, the Jonas Brothers performed "Don't Throw It Away" instead of "Strangers".
 During the show in Los Angeles, the Jonas Brothers were again joined by Big Rob in the performance of "Burnin' Up".
On November 19 and from November 29 to December 15, 2019 Like It's Christmas was added preceding the fan request, Mandy's Megamix and also both directly preceding and following Fly with Me
 Beginning with the January 29, 2020, show in Birmingham, "What a Man Gotta Do" was added to the set list.

Fan requests

The following songs were performed in place of "Can't Have You".

 During the first show in Orlando, "Jersey" and "Gotta Find You".
 During the shows in Tampa, Birmingham and Milwaukee, "Take a Breath".
 During the show in Kansas City, "Games".
 During the show in Philadelphia, "Pushin' Me Away".
 During the show in Albany, "Turn Right" and "Just Friends".
 During the show in Buffalo, "A Little Bit Longer".
 During the show in Atlanta, the first show in New York City, the show in Indianapolis, the show in Portland and the second show in Orlando, "Please Be Mine".
 During the second show in New York City and the show in New Orleans, "Goodnight and Goodbye". 
 During the show in Pittsburgh, "Hello Beautiful".
 During the show in Columbus, "Turn Right".
 During the show in Detroit, the second show in Los Angeles, and the first show in Chicago, "Just Friends".
 During the show in Nashville, "Jersey".
 During the show in St. Louis, "Hollywood". 
During the show in Tulsa “Feelin’ Alive”. 
 During the first show in Toronto and the show in Saint Paul, "Sorry".
 During the show in Houston, "Who I Am".
 During the show in Uncasville, the show in Phoenix, the show in Las Vegas and the show in Monterrey "Still In Love With You".
 During the second show in Mexico City and the show in Charlotte, "Don't Speak".

Tour dates

Notes

References

2019 concert tours
2020 concert tours
Reunion concert tours
Jonas Brothers concert tours